Do Ab Mardakh (also Romanized as Do Āb Mardakh; also known as Deh-e Ābmardakh and Mardakh) is a village in Howmeh Rural District, in the Central District of Rasht County, Gilan Province, Iran. At the 2006 census, its population was 250, in 79 families.

References 

Populated places in Rasht County